Mary Elizabeth Tyler (July 10, 1881 – September 10, 1924) was an Atlanta public-relations professional who, along with Edward Young Clarke, founded the Southern Publicity Association. Their organization helped to turn the initially anemic second Ku Klux Klan into a mass-membership organization with a broader social agenda. They also worked with the Anti-Saloon League during the same period.

Early life
Mary Elizabeth Cornett was born on July 10, 1881.

Civic engagement
Tyler became active in the "better babies" movement as a volunteer hygiene worker in the 1910s. With Clarke, she formed the Atlanta-based Southern Publicity Association, which promoted temperance and public health causes such as the Anti-Saloon League and Red Cross. Like Clarke and the second Klan's initial organizer William Simmons, Tyler was active in fraternal organizations—in her case, in a women's auxiliary called the Daughters of America.

Starting in 1920, Tyler and Clarke were extremely successful in building the organization of the Klan and in promoting a broader agenda for it, including temperance, anticommunism, antisemitism, and anticatholicism. They did well for themselves financially, pocketing 80% of every new klansman's initiation fee, all the while investing in businesses that manufactured Klan robes and paraphernalia. Tyler owned the Searchlight, the Klan's newspaper. She built a large classical-revival house on fourteen acres in downtown Atlanta; the house is now listed in the National Register of Historic Places.

The Klan was organized in the fashion of a fraternal organization. Clarke and Tyler's sexual relationship was not a well kept secret, and Clarke's wife May sued him for divorce on grounds of desertion. In 1919, Clarke and Tyler were rousted out of bed by Atlanta police and arrested on charges of disorderly conduct. They initially gave false names. Notwithstanding the Klan's temperance activities, they were fined for possessing whiskey. Their sexual relationship was in tension with the prominent role played by the purity of white womanhood in the organization's foundational mythology, which revolved around the real-life figure of Mary Phagan and the film The Birth of a Nation, which featured the fictional martyr Flora Cameron. In 1921, the Columbus Enquirer-Sun and the New York World published articles accusing Clarke and Tyler of financial and sexual misconduct. An internal power struggle ensued within the Klan, and as a result Tyler was forced out of the Klan in 1923, Clarke left the country to escape charges under the Mann Act, and power shifted to Hiram Wesley Evans. Tyler moved to Southern California.

Personal life
Tyler was first married at age 14 or 15, and then abandoned, and later married multiple times. Likely names of her husbands were Andrew M Manning (married 1897; divorced 1906), Owen C. Carroll (died Washington D.C. in 1913), Tyler, and Stephen Wolcott Grow (married 1922).

Death
Tyler died on September 10, 1924 in Altadena, California. She was buried in Inglewood Park Cemetery.

Further reading
 Henry Peck Fry, The modern Ku Klux Klan, Small, Maynard, 1922
 Michael Newton, The Ku Klux Klan in Mississippi: a history, McFarland, 2010
 Kathleen M. Blee, Women of the Klan: racism and  gender in the 1920s, University of California Press, 2009
 Kevin Boyle, The Not-So-Invisible Empire, The New York Times, Nov. 27, 2011
 National Register of Historic Places, reference number 05001598; scans available at  http://www.buckheadheritage.com/node/61

References

1881 births
1924 deaths
American temperance activists
Former Ku Klux Klan members
American anti-communists
American Ku Klux Klan members